This is a list of electoral divisions for the Australian 2010 federal election for the Australian Capital Territory  and the Northern Territory.
__toc__

Australian Capital Territory

Results by division

Canberra

Fraser

Northern Territory

Results by division

Lingiari

Solomon

See also 

 2010 Australian federal election
 Results of the 2010 Australian federal election (House of Representatives)
 Post-election pendulum for the 2010 Australian federal election
 Members of the Australian House of Representatives, 2010–2013

References 

Territories 2010